Tobías Antonio Vargas (born 21 August 1989) is a Paraguayan international footballer who plays for Fuerza Amarilla S.C. in the Ecuadorian Serie A, as a goalkeeper.

Career
Vargas has played club football for Libertad, Sportivo Luqueño and Capiatá.

He made his international debut for Paraguay in 2012.

References

External links

1989 births
Living people
Paraguayan footballers
Paraguay international footballers
Association football goalkeepers
Club Libertad footballers
Sportivo Luqueño players
Deportivo Capiatá players
Paraguayan Primera División players
Nacional Potosí players
Expatriate footballers in Bolivia